Donatus Djagom (10 May 1919 – 29 November 2011) was an Indonesian Bishop of the Roman Catholic Church.

Djagom was born in Bilas, Indonesia and ordained a priest on 28 August 1949 from the religious order of Society of Divine Word. He was appointed bishop of the Roman Catholic Archdiocese of Ende on 19 December 1968 and ordained archbishop on 11 June 1969. Djagom retired on 23 February 1996.

References

1919 births
2011 deaths
20th-century Roman Catholic archbishops in Indonesia
Divine Word Missionaries Order
People from East Nusa Tenggara
Place of death missing